Shirish Hiremath (born 17 July 1951) is an Indian interventional cardiologist and past president of Cardiological Society of India (CSI).

Hiremath is an alumnus of B.J. Medical College, Pune and University of Mumbai. He is director of Cardiac Cath Lab, Ruby Hall Clinic, Pune.

Hiremath is known for creating awareness about prevention, early diagnosis and treatment of cardiovascular diseases at community level in India.

He has contributed to research studies in the field of interventional cardiology and popularized use of pharmaco-invasive approach for treatment of myocardial infarction in Indian patients.

References

External links 
 Official Website

1951 births
Living people
People from Pune
21st-century Indian medical doctors
University of Mumbai alumni
Indian cardiologists